Festo Richard Sanga   is a Tanzanian  politician who serves as a Member of Parliament representing   Makete Constituency in the   Parliament of Tanzania.   He was elected on 28 October 2020.  He is a member of Chama Cha Mapinduzi political party.  He serves as a member of the  Administration and Local Government Affair Committee in the Parliament of Tanzania.

Early life & education background
Sanga was born on 15 January 1988 in Makete District. He attended   Bulongwa Primary School for his Certificate of Primary Education Examination (1996 – 2002), Mwakavuta Secondary School for his Certificate of Secondary Education Examination (2003–2006), and   Lufilyo High School for his Certificate of Advanced Secondary Education Examination. He graduated with a Bachelor of Arts in Education from University of Dar es Salaam in 2012.

Career

Working experience
He has served as the  Executive Director of Singinda United Football Club from 2017 to 2020.

Politics
On 28 October 2020, he was elected as a Member of Parliament  representing  Makete Constituency  in the  Parliament of Tanzania (2020 to 2025)  in the 2020 Tanzanian general election and on 10 November 2020  he sworn in as the Member of Parliament.

Personal life
Sanga  is married to Mary Mshirage together they have 2 children; Sarah Festo Sanga, Gracious Festo Sanga. He belongs to Chama Cha Mapinduzi.

References

External references
 Website of the Parliament of  Tanzania.

Sanga Festo at Twitter

Living people
1988 births
Tanzanian politicians
21st-century Tanzanian politicians